Da' Take Over is Angel & Khriz's third studio album. The album was released under VI Records label. It was released on March 23, 2010. It was nominated for a Lo Nuestro Award for Urban Album of the Year.

Track listing
 No Hacen Na –  3:39 Angel Rivera, Christian Colon, Juan Santana
 Ella Quiere (Que, He, He) – 2:48 Angel Rivera, Christian Colon, Jose Barbosa, Juan Santana
 Ayer La Vi – 3:56 Angel Rivera, Christian Colon, Juan Santana
 Sin Vergüenza – 3:52 Angel Rivera, Christian Colon, Hector Padilla, Juan Santana, Miguel De Jesus
 Maltrátame – 3:08 Angel Rivera, Christian Colon, Juan Santana
 No Vale La Pena – 3:50 Angel Rivera, Christian Colon, Juan Santana
 Súbelo (Turn It Up) – 3:40 Angel Rivera, Christian Colon, Juan Santana, Tramar Dillard
 Me Enamoré – 4:16 Angel Rivera, Christian Colon, Jose Torres, Juan Santana
 Tu Gato Nuevo – 3:23 Angel Rivera, Christian Colon, Juan Santana
 Mal Negocio (Ya No) - 4:07 Angel Rivera, Christian Colon, Juan Santana, Victor Manuelle
 Dime – 3:14 Angel Rivera, Christian Colon, Juan Santana
 ¿Qué Hay Que Hacer? – 3:34 Angel Rivera, Christian Colon, Jexel Reyes
 Como Olvidarte – 4:20 Angel Rivera, Christian Colon, Daniel Velazquez, Juan Santana

See also
List of number-one Billboard Latin Rhythm Albums of 2010

References

2010 albums
Angel & Khriz albums